Siegfried Viebahn (July 29, 1911 – April 23, 1996) was a German diver who competed in the 1936 Summer Olympics. In 1936 he finished seventh in the 10 metre platform event.

References

1911 births
1996 deaths
German male divers
Olympic divers of Germany
Divers at the 1936 Summer Olympics
20th-century German people